Rajko Igić (born 1937) is a Serbian doctor, scientist, and writer. He is best known for discovery of angiotensin I converting enzyme (ACE) in the retina, publications on the influence of the war in Yugoslavia on publishing in peer reviewed journals, poetry works, and his anti-tobacco movement in the Former Yugoslavia, Serbia, and Republic of Srpska. Igić is a member of the Academy of Sciences and Arts of Republic of Srpska.

He received his M.D. at the University of Belgrade and Ph.D. at the University of Sarajevo. He was a Professor of Pharmacology at the University of Tuzla (1978-1992), and the Director of the Department of Scientific, Cultural, and Educational International Exchange for the Republic of Bosnia and Herzegovina from 1990 to 1992, when he left at the start of the War in Bosnia and Herzegovina. His research career centered on the Renin–angiotensin system. While at the Universities of Tuzla and Banja Luka in the 1980s, Igić organized an early anti-smoking campaign aimed at the territories of former Yugoslavia. Igić served as the Editor-in-Chief of a Scripta Medica (Banja Luka), a medical journal, from 2010-2013. 

He also devised a new script, Slavica, a fused version of the (Cyrillic and Latin alphabet), used by speakers of the predominant South Slavic languages (Serbo-Croatian). It was a quixotic attempt to mend the linguistic divisions among the Yugoslav ethnic groups, prior to outbreak of widespread conflict.

Igić writes poetry, and he published several poetry books in English and Serbian.

He currently resides in Chicago, Illinois, where he was, until retirement, a senior scientist in the Department of Anesthesiology and Pain Management at Cook County Hospital.

Work

Medical books 
Igić R. Osnovi gerijatrije, drugo izdanje. Banjaluka, Medicinski fakultet, 2020.
Igić R. Osnovi farmakografije. Sarajevo, Svjetlost, 1978.
Kako se pišu saopštenja o medicinskim istraživanjima. Sarajevo: Veselin Masleša, 1980.
(with Ranko Škrbić) Kako se pišu i publikuju saopštenja o biomedicinskim istraživanjima. Banja Luka:Grafomark, 2012. 
Igić R, et al. Naučna istraživanja i naučna saopštenja. Banjaluka, Medicinski fakultet, 2017. 
Igić R. Osnovi gerijatrije. Sombor, Fondacija, 2019.
Igić R. Osnovi gerijatrije, drugo izdanje. Banjaluka, Medicinski fakultet, 2020.
Farmakologija renin-angiotenzin sistema. Banja Luka, Medicinski fakultet, 2014.

On Renin-Angiotensin and Kallikrein-Kinin systems 
Igić R, Erdos EG, Yeh HS, Sorells K, Nakajima T. Angiotensin I converting enzyme of the lung. Circ Res 1972;30-31:51-61. 
Igić R, Robinson CJG, Erdos EG. Angiotensin I converting enzyme in the choroid plexus and in the retina. Sixth International Congress of Pharmacology. Helsinki, 1975, Abstract 408.
Igic R, Robinson CJG, Erdos EG. Angiotensin I converting enzyme activity in the choroid plexus and in the retinal. In: Buckley JP, Ferrario CM, eds. Central actions of angiotensin and related hormones. New York: Pergamon Press, 1977: 23-7.
Igić R., Robinson CJG, Milošević Ž, Wilson C, Erdos EG. Activity of renin and angiotensin converting enzyme in retina and ciliary body. (In Serbo-croatian). Liječ Vjes 1977;99:482-4.
Ward PE, Stewart TA, Hammon KJ, Reynolds RC, *Igić R. Angiotensin I converting enzyme (kininase II) in isolated retinal microvessels. Life Sci 1979;24:1419-24.
Igić R, Kojović V. Angiotensin I converting enzyme (kininase II) in ocular tissues. Exp Eye Res 1980;30:299-303.
Igić R. Kallikrein and kininases in ocular tissues. Exp Eye Res 1985;41:117-120.
Igić R, Wania-Galicia L, Jackman LH. Metabolism of angiotensin I by guinea pig aqueous humor. Can J Physiol Pharmacol 2001;79:627-30. 
Igić R, Behnia R. Properties and distribution of angiotensin I converting enzyme.
Curr Pharm Des 2003;9:697-706.
Škrbić R, *Igić R. Seven decades of angiotensin (1939-2009). Peptides 2009;30:1945-50.
Igić R, Škrbić R. The renin-angiotensin system and its blockers. Srp Arh Celok Lek 2014;142:756-63.
Sokolova-Djokic L, Zizic-Borjanovic S, Igic R. Cigarette smoking in Serbia. Impact of the 78-day NATO bombing campaign. J BUON 2008;13(2):285-9.
Igić R. Can outstanding research be done under less than ideal conditions? Einstein J Biol Med 2003;20:23-27.
Igić R. Remembrances of Ulf Svante von Euler. Acta Physiol (Oxf). 2018 Nov;224(3):e13098. doi: 10.1111/apha.13098. 
Igić R. Four decades of ocular renin-angiotensin and kallikrein-kinin systems (1977-2017). Exp Eye Res 2018;166:74-83. doi: 10.1016/j.exer.2017.05.007. 
The renin-angiotensin system and its blockers.
Igić R, Škrbić R. Srp Arh Celok Lek. 2014 Nov-Dec;142(11-12):756-63. doi: 10.2298/sarh1412756i.
Igić R. An exploration of bioactive peptides: My collaboration with Ervin G. Erdös.
J Biol Chem. 2018 May 25;293(21):7907-7915. doi: 10.1074/jbc.X118.003433.

Other writings 
Igić R. Nova slovarica. Tuzla, Univerzal, 1987.
Igić R. Why not test reading in three alphabets. American Psychologist 1999;54:1130-2.
The Destiny of Germans in St. Ivan and Other Writings. .

Poetry
Лази Костићу из Чикага. [To Laza Kostić from Chicago.] Banjaluka, Besjeda, 2017.
Која је сврха живота. [What is the purpose of life.] Banjaluka, GrafoMark, 2020.
Eleven Poems and One Story. .
Come, Live in This World!  
Pictures from Serbia: My Gypsy Neighbors.

References
"Amid War, Scientific Publication Survives In Former Yugoslav Republics", The Scientist 1997, 11(1):11

1937 births
Living people
Serbian scientists
Scientists from Chicago
Creators of writing systems
University of Belgrade Faculty of Medicine alumni